The Cork-Kilkenny rivalry is a hurling rivalry between Irish county teams Cork and Kilkenny, who first played each other in 1894. It is considered to be one of the biggest rivalries in Gaelic games. Kilkenny's home ground is Nowlan Park and Cork's home ground is Páirc Uí Chaoimh, however, all of their championship meetings have been held at neutral venues, usually Croke Park.

While Cork have the highest number of Munster titles and Kilkenny are the standard bearers in Leinster, they are also two of the most successful teams in the All-Ireland Senior Hurling Championship, having won 66 championship titles between them to date.

As of 2021 the sides have met 29 times in the hurling championship including meeting 24 times at the All Ireland final stage, more than any other All Ireland hurling final fixture, (Kilkenny have won 13 of these finals compared to Cork’s 9 final wins with 2 draw’s).

Regarded as two of hurling's "big three", with Tipperary making up the trio, an All-Ireland final between Cork and Kilkenny is regarded as a special occasion.

History

1893: Beginnings

An inauspicious start to one of the greatest rivalries on 24 June 1894.  Cork won on probably the most unsuitable playing surface in hurling history after somebody neglected to get the grass cut at the original venue in Ashtown.  The goalposts were uprooted and spectators and players alike moved to the Phoenix Park after a long delay.  Cork, represented by Blackrock, gave an exhibition of hurling and led by 3-4 to 0-1 at the interval.  Each side made exactly the same return in the second half to give Cork the victory.

1903-1912: Kilkenny's first great era

On 16 July 1905, Cork played Kilkenny in the delayed 1903 All-Ireland home final. The Cats were completely overwhelmed as Cork powered to an 8-9 to 0-8 victory.

The delayed 1904 All-Ireland final, played on 24 June 1906, pitted three-in-a-row hopefuls Cork against Kilkenny. After losing four previous finals Kilkenny finally triumphed. Dick Doyle's first-half goal set the Cats on their way, while a last-minute miracle save by 'keeper Pat "Fox" Maher secured a narrow 1-9 to 1-8 victory.

Cork's 5-10 to 3-13 defeat of Kilkenny in the delayed 1905 All-Ireland final, played on 14 April 1907, was declared null and void as Cork goalkeeper Daniel McCarthy was a British Army reservist, while Kilkenny's Matt Gargan had played with Waterford in earlier rounds of the championship. The replay on 30 June 1907 saw Kilkenny's Jimmy Kelly score a record-equalling 5-2. Kilkenny scored their seven goals in a thirty-minute spell. A puck-out by Cork goalkeeper Jamesy Kelleher is said to have bounced and hopped over the Kilkenny crossbar for a point. Kilkenny powered to a 7-7 to 2-9 victory.

The delayed All-Ireland final on 21 June 1908 saw Cork face Kilkenny at Fraher Field. Jimmy Kelly got the first of his hat-trick of goals within seconds of the start. The game looked to be heading for a replay when Jack Anthony scored the winning point. The Cats survived two Cork goal hunts in the dying minutes and claimed a narrow 3-12 to 4-8 victory.

Gate receipts were a record £589 at Croke Park for the All-Ireland meeting of Cork and Kilkenny on 17 November 1912. Kilkenny's ability to score goals proved decisive as they recorded another one-point defeat of Cork. Sim Walton pulled on a long, dropping ball from Jimmy Kelly for Kilkenny's first goal. A long Matt Gargan ball dropped past the Cork 'keeper and stopped just an inch over the line for their second. A 2-1 to 1-3 score line gave Kilkenny their sixth All-Ireland title in nine years.

1926: A lone meeting after a fourteen-year absence

On 24 October 1926 Cork and Kilkenny did battle on a snow-covered Croke Park. Three Meagher brothers - Lory, Willie and Henry - bolstered the Kilkenny team. Paddy "Balty" Ahern led the Cork attack as the Rebels had the narrowest of leads at the interval. Kilkenny slumped in the second half, going down to a 4-6 to 2-0 defeat. It was the first of thirteen All-Ireland victories for legendary Cork trained Jim "Tough" Barry.

1931: Three All-Ireland finals

On 6 September 1931 Cork and Kilkenny faced each other in the All-Ireland decider. The first half was closely contested, with a goal from Mick Ahern helping Cork to a half-time lead of 1-3 to 0-2. Cork stretched the advantage to six points in the second half, but Kilkenny came storming back with a goal and then four points on the trot to take the lead by one point. In the dying moments Cork captain Eudie Coughlan got possession and made his way towards the goal. As he did so he slipped and fell but struck the sliotar while he was down on his knees, and it went over the bar to level the scores at 1-6 apiece and force a replay.

The replay took place a month later on 11 October 1931 and is regarded as a classic for its swinging fortunes. Cork once again had a four-point lead at the interval, however, Kilkenny again fought back in the second half. Lory Meagher sent over a 90-yard free to level the game at 2-5 apiece and again force a replay. After the game officials pressed for extra time, however, Cork captain Coughlan rejected this as a younger Kilkenny team would have the upper hand on an aging Cork team. It was also suggested at a meeting of the Central Council that both counties be declared joint champions and that half an All-Ireland medal by given to each player. This motion was later defeated.

Once again Cork and Kilkenny assembled at Croke Park on 1 November 1931 for the third installment of the All-Ireland final. Kilkenny captain Lory Meagher was ruled out of the game because of broken ribs sustained in the first replay and watched the game wearing his overcoat on the sideline. Such was the esteem in which he was held the game was virtually conceded to Cork since the star captain couldn't play. In spite of fielding a younger team, Kilkenny were defeated by Cork on a score line of 5-8 to 3-4. It was the first occasion when the GAA realised the lucrative nature of replays. Central Council reported earnings of £8000 from the gate at the three games.

1939-1947: Two iconic All-Ireland meetings

On the same day that England and France declared war on Germany, the All-Ireland final between Cork and Kilkenny entered the realms of folklore as the famous "thunder and lightning final", so called because the climax of the game was played in a fierce thunderstorm.  A then record crowd of 39,000 for a Cork-Kilkenny game saw both sides remain level for much of the game.  Kilkenny pulled forward by three points at one stage, however, Willie Campbell landed a long-range free in the net for a dramatic equalising goal for Cork.  While it looked as if the game was heading for a replay Kilkenny's Terry Leahy whipped over the winning point after he connected with a Paddy Phelan 70-yards free.  With that the long whistle sounded and Kilkenny were the champions by 2-7 to 3-3.

After a seven-year absence, Cork and Kilkenny renewed their rivalry in the All-Ireland decider on 1 September 1946. Cork were aiming for a fifth All-Ireland title within six years, while Kilkenny were All-Ireland runners-up to Tipperary the previous year. While some had written off Cork's chances, they took an interval lead of four points. With ten minutes remaining Cork's lead was reduced to just two points, however, goals by Mossy O'Riordan and Joe Kelly secured the 7-6 to 3-8 victory.

Regarded by many oldtimers as the greatest All-Ireland final of them all, there was much at stake when Cork and Kilkenny met each other on 7 September 1947.  After losing back-to-back championship deciders in 1945 and 1946, Kilkenny faced the unpalatable prospect of becoming the first team in championship history to lose three-in-a-row.  Cork, on the other hand, were hoping to capture an unprecedented sixth All-Ireland title in seven years.  Like many of their previous contests there was little to separate these two sides.  Kilkenny took a narrow 0-7 to 0-5 lead at the interval, however, the game was far from over.  Mossy O'Riordan and Joe Kelly got Cork back into the game with two second-half goals, however, Kilkenny's Jim Langton and Terry Leahy were the key players with tallies of 0-3 and 0-6 respectively.  As the game headed towards a replay it was Leahy who chipped over the winning point.  It was the first time since 1893 that Kilkenny failed to score a goal against Cork.

1966-1972: Renewed rivalry

After an absence of nineteen years, Cork and Kilkenny faced each other in the All-Ireland final on 4 September 1966. Cork, seeking a first title in twelve years, laid the foundations for this victory with a solid first-half performance as having played into the win they trailed by 0-7 to 1-2. Not long after the restart Cork went ahead with Colm Sheehan scoring a hat-trick of goals. A 3-9 to 1-10 gave Cork the title in front of a then record of 68,249 spectators.

The respective All-Ireland champions of 1966 and 1967 faced each other in the last sixty-minute All-Ireland final on 7 September 1969. Cork had the better of the opening half and had a three-point lead at the break. The third quarter saw Kilkenny with the edge and on two occasions the sides could not be separated. Cork faded completely in the final quarter allowing Kilkenny to ease to a 2-15 to 2-9 victory.

Regarded as one of the classic games of the modern era, the All-Ireland final on 3 September 1972 was the only eighty-minute championship decider between Cork and Kilkenny.  In a game that produced a plethora of scores, Cork's ability to find the net gave them a 2-8 to 0-12 lead at the interval.  Halfway through the second-half Cork were on form and stretched their lead to eight points.  Drastic action was required for Kilkenny and Eddie Keher was deployed closer to the Cork goal.  One of the most abiding memories of that game is of Keher grabbing the sliotar out of the sky and racing up the wing in the shadow of the Hogan Stand.  From that sideline position Keher pucked the sliotar as if going for a point, however, the sliotar dropped short, deceiving Cork goalkeeper Paddy Barry, and ending up in the back of the net.  After scoring that goal an almost emotionless Keher simply turned around to go back to his normal playing position with blood pouring out of a cut over his eye.  Keher finished the game with a tally of 2-9 as Kilkenny scored seven points without reply to capture a memorable 3-24 to 5-11 victory.

1978-1983: Kilkenny double after Cork treble

Not the greatest of games between these two sides, however, it was notable as Cork attempted to capture a third All-Ireland title in-a-row on 3 September 1978.  The game ebbed and flowed for much of the seventy minutes with no side breaking away. The sides were level eight times.  With thirteen minutes left Jimmy Barry-Murphy hit a low shot in towards the goal and it bobbled in past goalkeeper Noel Skehan. A 1-15 to 2-8 gave Cork their first championship three-in-a-row since 1954.

Kilkenny were rank outsiders going into the All-Ireland final on 5 September 1982 as the attendance dropped below 60,000 for the first time since before World War II. The opening eighteen minutes were frantic, however, a Noel Skehan save from a Seánie O'Leary shot inspired Kilkenny. A brace of goals from Christy Heffernan in two minutes just before the break gave the Cats a commanding 2-11 to 0-7 lead. Cork rallied after the restart, however, Skehan was the hero for Kilkenny as they powered to a 3-18 to 1-13 victory.

The first period of the All-Ireland final on 4 September 1983 was similar to the previous year as Kilkenny built up a healthy interval advantage of six points. Shortly after the restart the Noresiders advantage was nine points, however, they failed to score for the last seventeen minutes of the game. Cork rallied and narrowed the deficit to two points before running out of time. Billy Fitzpatrick had a dream game, scoring 0-10 for Kilkenny, while Noel Skehan won a ninth All-Ireland medal, a full twenty years after he won his first as a substitute.

1992: A lone meeting

The Cats were the favourites going into the All-Ireland final on 6 September 1992 as they sought their first championship in nine years. Cork, however, had earlier dethroned reigning champions Tipperary and were aiming for a second All-Ireland crown in two years. The final was going to script in the first half as Cork shot five points without reply before D. J. Carey rattled home a penalty before half-time to leave them just two adrift at the beginning of the second period. Christy Heffernan entered the fray in the second half and inspired Kilkenny to up their performance. John Power kicked a goal and Cork, despite a Ger Manley goal, were unable to get back on terms as Kilkenny ran out winners on a 3-10 to 1-12 scoreline.

1999-2006: Cork and Kilkenny dominate

As the century drew to a close so to did the hurling revolution of the nineties. The old order restored their grip on the Liam MacCarthy Cup with Cork and Kilkenny squaring off against each other in the All-Ireland final on 12 September 1999. In a dour contest played on a wet day, Cork trailed by 0-5 to 0-4 after a low-scoring first half. Kilkenny increased the pace after the interval, pulling into a four-point lead but Cork always kept in touch in a game in which both defences were on top. Kilkenny were 0-11 to 0-08 ahead and suddenly Cork moved up a gear and through Joe Deane, Ben O'Connor and Seánie McGrath Cork scored five unanswered points. Kilkenny could only manage one more score – a point from a Henry Shefflin free – and Cork held out to win by 0-13 to 0-12, their first defeat of Kilkenny since 1978.

After a four-year hiatus, Cork and Kilkenny lined out against each other in the All-Ireland decider on 14 September 2003. The conclusion at the end was that Cork, who had endured a winter of discontent on Leeside culminating in a players' strike, had left the All-Ireland title behind them. Kilkenny sparkled in the first half when the Munster champions were haunted by some terrible finishing and stuttered in the face of an admirable recovery that was given huge impetus by Setanta Ó hAilpín's 53rd-minute goal. But Kilkenny had the character and the strength in defence to survive and then triumph through Martin Comerford's goal five minutes from the end of normal time.

On 12 September 2004, Cork and Kilkenny renewed their All-Ireland rivalry for a second year in-a-row. Kilkenny, as reigning champions, were attempting to claim a third successive All-Ireland championship, while Cork were out to gain revenge for defeat the previous year. The game was an unassuming one, played on a dull, overcast day. The sides were level for much of the game, however, in the final twenty minutes Cork scored nine points without reply and secured a 0-17 to 0-9 victory.

For the third time in four years, Cork faced Kilkenny in the All-Ireland decider on 3 September 2006. Cork were aiming to become the first team since 1978 to win a third successive All-Ireland championship. Revenge was foremost in the minds of Kilkenny as it was Cork who denied their own chance at three-in-a-row in 2004. In a bruising encounter, the teams were level five times before Diarmuid O'Sullivan dropped a high ball into Aidan Fogarty's path in the 29th minute and he rocketed a shot to the Cork net. Kilkenny led 1-8 to 0-8 at the break and while Ben O'Connor's 67th-minute goal, set up by the bulldozing Niall McCarthy, jangled nerves, Kilkenny held on for a 1-16 to 1-13 victory.

2008-2013: Kilkenny's dominant as Cork decline

By 2008, Cork's great team of the earlier part of the decade was in decline while Kilkenny were enjoying the most remarkable run of success in the history of the championship. On 10 August that year both sides faced each other in an All-Ireland semi-final. The Leesiders gave it their best shot early on and the sides were level six times in the opening twenty one minutes. But when Eoin Larkin found himself in space for a Kilkenny goal after twenty nine minutes to have his side 1-9 to 0-6 in front, the champions were in control for the remainder. The nearest Cork came to closing the gap in the second half was to make it a five-point margin. Kilkenny claimed a 1-23 to 0-17 victory as Cork's stalwart full-back, Diarmuid O'Sullivan, made an emotional exit from inter-county hurling.

With the four-in-a-row taken care of, Kilkenny set their sights on an unprecedented fifth successive championship in 2010. On 8 August Cork faced Kilkenny in the All-Ireland semi-final. The Cats controlled the game with a masterful performance, killing off the Cork challenge with goals from Eddie Brennan and Aidan Fogarty on their way to a 13-point interval lead. Cork did stage a revival in the second half with a string of well-taken scores from Patrick Horgan and Ben O'Connor, but the Cats grabbed a third goal from Richie Power to secure a 3-22 to 0-19 victory.

On 28 July 2013, Cork faced Kilkenny at Semple Stadium in the first ever meeting of the two sides at the All-Ireland quarter-final stage, Kilkenny entered the game clinging onto their hopes of a securing a tenth All-Ireland championship following narrow wins over Tipperary and Waterford. Kilkenny were boosted with the inclusion of Henry Shefflin and Michael Fennelly in their starting line-up, after the duo bounced back from a period on the sidelines due to injury. Patrick Horgan, who had his red card from the Munster final rescinded, returned to boost Cork's chances. Cork led for most of the game, while Kilkenny were dealt a major blow with a second yellow card for Shefflin late in the first half, as Cork claimed an 0-11 to 0-06 interval lead. Kilkenny battled hard on the restart, but Cork kept ahead with goalkeeper Anthony Nash inspirational in Cork's first victory over Kilkenny since 2004.

2019: All-Ireland Quarter-final

Despite being heavy favourite for a successive championship win over Kilkenny, Cork blew a two point half-time lead and were outclassed by a resurgent Kilkenny by a scoreline of 1-16 to 0-08 in the second half. Despite an heroic 3-10 individual tally scored by Pa Horgan, Cork were dumped out of the Championship to end the 2010s without an All-Ireland title; the first decade since the 1880s in which Cork failed to win at least one title.

Statistics

All time results

Legend

Senior championship

National League

Intermediate championship

Junior championship

Under-21 championship

Minor championship

Records

Scorelines

 Biggest championship win:
 For Cork: Cork 6-8 - 0-2 Kilkenny, All-Ireland final, Phoenix Park, 24 June 1894
 For Kilkenny: Kilkenny 7-7 - 2-9 Cork, All-Ireland final refixture, Fraher Field, 30 June 1907
 Biggest league win:
 For Cork: Cork 8-6 - 1-3 Kilkenny, National League Round 4, Cork Athletic Grounds, 18 April 1926
 For Kilkenny:
Kilkenny 8-10 - 2-1 Cork, National League Round 1, Nowlan Park, 6 November 1949
Kilkenny 4-26 - 0-11 Cork, National League Round 6, Nowlan Park, 5 April 2009
 Highest aggregate:
 Kilkenny 3-24 - 5-11 Cork, All-Ireland final, Croke Park, 7 September 1972

Most appearances

Top scorers

Top scorer in a single game:
For Kilkenny: 2-9
 Eddie Keher, Kilkenny 3-24 - 5-11 Cork, All-Ireland final, Croke Park, 7 September 1972
For Cork: 3-0
 Colm Sheehan, Cork 3-9 - Kilkenny 1-10, All-Ireland final, Croke Park, 4 September 1966

Attendances

Highest attendance:
82,275 - Kilkenny 1-16 - 1-13 Cork, All-Ireland final, Croke Park, 3 September 2006
Lowest attendance:
1,000 - Cork 6-8 - 0-2 Kilkenny, All-Ireland final, Phoenix Park, 24 June 1894

Club level

As well as the rivalry between the inter-county sides, Cork and Kilkenny club teams have also met on numerous occasions in the various All-Ireland club competitions.

Legend

Senior championship

Intermediate championship

Junior championship

Individual rivalries

Among the elite group of players hurling fans consider as contenders for the title, greatest player of all time, Cork's Christy Ring and Kilkenny's Henry Shefflin are probably the most famous, and generally dominate polls on the subject. Some of their fellow countymen also feature regularly in such debates, such as Cork's Jack Lynch and Brian Corcoran and Kilkenny's Paddy Phelan, Lory Meagher and Jim Langton, many of whom were named on the Hurling Team of the Century. However, the over-riding discussion about which of Ring and Shefflin is the greater has proved to be never ending. Even though most consider them as the best players of their own times, many consider the comparison between them useless, as they played during incomparable eras.

Ring remains the most iconic of hurlers, possessed of everything from talent and ferocious application to longevity and a string of records, including the first to reach eight All-Ireland medals. Obsessive about the game, he worked relentlessly to sustain a formidable array of techniques, complemented by great vision and anticipation. Physically resilient, he played senior inter-county between 1939 and 1963, when he retired as the top championship scorer of all time. A decade later Kilkenny's Eddie Keher broke Ring's scoring record. When Keher won his sixth All-Ireland medal in 1975, Kilkenny trainer Tommy Maher said: "At this stage, I must say Eddie Keher is the greatest I've seen. The second greatest was Christy Ring. Up until last year, perhaps, I would have reversed that order. But I have no doubt at all now, because Keher has done so much for the game, has played it so brilliantly, scores so brilliantly and at all times then a thorough gentleman – a credit to the game.".

The emergence of D. J. Carey as a force with Kilkenny in the 1990s brought a new challenger to Ring's status as the undisputed number one hurler of all time. D. J. Carey scored 44 points in All-Ireland Hurling Finals, edging Ring's record by a single point.

At the time of his retirement in 2014, Henry Shefflin had seemed to edge out all other legends of the game for the title of hurling's greatest. As the greatest player on the greatest team of all time, he broke all records: 10 All-Ireland medals, 11 All Stars and a record career championship total of 27-483. Intimidating in his reliability on the biggest of occasions. Above all an inspiring leader, his abilities combined power and fearlessness in winning ball with subtlety and accuracy in its use.

Players
The rivalry between the two teams has not prevented their respective countrymen from playing in each other's club championships, in certain cases to high renown. In 1939 Martin White became one of the first Kilkenny players to play club hurling in Cork when he joined the famous Blackrock club. Over thirty years later Frank Cummins won the first of his three All-Ireland medals at club level with Blackrock. In 2005 ten-time All-Ireland medal winner Henry Shefflin was linked with a move to the Blackrock club.

Cork have also supplied players to various Kilkenny clubs. Three-time All-Ireland club medal winner Donie Collins, a native of Castlehaven, transferred from Blackrock to James Stephens in 1981 and quickly won a record-breaking fourth medal in 1982. In 1989, Cork's four-time dual All-Ireland medal winner Brian Murphy joined the O'Loughlin Gaels club where he became heavily involved as a player and coach.

References

Kilkenny
Kilkenny county hurling team rivalries